Philip, Phillip or Phil Evans may refer to:

 Philip Evans and John Lloyd (1645–1679), Welsh Roman Catholic priest and saint
 Phil Evans (soccer, born 1980), South African football (soccer) player
 Phil Evans (Australian footballer) (born 1950), Australian rules footballer
 Phil Evans (darts player), Welsh darts player
 Philip Evans (headmaster) (born 1948), British educationalist and headmaster
 Philip Evans (cricketer) (born 1982), English cricketer 
 Phillip Evans (baseball) (born 1992), American baseball player